The 1990 Badminton World Cup was the twelfth edition of an international tournament Badminton World Cup. The event was held from  14 November to 18 November 1990. Competitions for group stage were conducted in Bandung while final matches were scheduled for Istora Senayan in Jakarta. Indonesia won the women's singles and mixed doubles events while China won the men's singles & women's doubles categories. Malaysia secured a title in men's doubles discipline.

Medalists

Men's singles

Finals

Women's singles

Finals

Men's doubles

Finals

Women's doubles

Finals

Mixed doubles

Finals

References 
 https://web.archive.org/web/20061214225120/http://tangkis.tripod.com/world/1990.htm
 
 
https://www.myheritage.com/research/record-10450-9119017/canberra-times-act?snippet=e271cc3cbdd163417e9ae28e8b65609d
https://eresources.nlb.gov.sg/newspapers/Digitised/Page/straitstimes19901118-1.1.32

Badminton World Cup
1990 in badminton
1990 in Indonesian sport
Sports competitions in Jakarta
International sports competitions hosted by Indonesia